Fidyah and Kaffara are religious donations made in Islam when a fast (notably in Ramadan) is missed or broken. The donations can be of food, or money, and it is used to feed those in need. They are mentioned in the Qur'an. Some organizations have online Fidyah and Kaffara options.

Fidyah
Fidyah (also romanized as Fidya) is a religious donation of money or food made to help those in need. 

Fidyah is made for fasts missed out of necessity, where the person is unable to make up for the fast afterwards – for example, if someone cannot fast for the required number of days due to ill health, pregnancy or of extreme age (old or young). In Ramadan, the Fidyah must be paid for each fast missed. If, however, one misses their fast due to being sick or on a journey, but will be healthy enough to make up for it, they should preferably make up for the fast at a later date, as prescribed in the Qur'an.

Kaffara
Kaffara (also romanized as Kaffarah), is a religious donation of money or food made to help those in need. 

Kaffara is made for fasts missed unnecessarily – for example, if someone misses or breaks a fast in the month of Ramadan without a valid reason. To make up for the broken fast, must free one slave and if unable to do so, they must fast continuously for 60 days. If they are unable to do that, they have to give a charitable compensation for the cost of an average meal for 60 poor people. In the UK, the 2021 Kaffara rate is £5 per person, amounting to £300 for each intentionally broken fast.

Paying a kaffarah is also necessary in Islam for breaking a promise or an oath.

In the Qur'an
Fidyah and Kaffara are mentioned in the Qur'an in the selection below:

See also
K-P-R
Fasting in Islam

References

Ramadan
Fasting in Islam
Islamic culture
Islamic terminology